The following is a list of notable events and releases of the year 1937 in Norwegian music.

Events

Deaths
 
 May
 9 – Fridthjov Anderssen, composer (born 1876).

Births

 February
 1 – Erik Amundsen, jazz bassist (died 2015).

 March
 6 – Arild Nyquist, novelist, poet, writer of children's books, and musician (died 2004).
 10 – Alfred Janson, pianist and composer.
 26 – Bjørn Lie-Hansen, opera singer (died 2018).

 May
 11 – Eyvind Solås, pianist, composer, actor and program host at NRK (died 2011).
 15 – Karin Krog, jazz singer and composer.

 October
 31 – Per Øien, classical flutist (died 2016).

See also
 1937 in Norway
 Music of Norway

References

 
Norwegian music
Norwegian
Music
1930s in Norwegian music